James Henry Vahey (1900–1949) was an American lawyer and political figure who served as chairman of the Massachusetts Democratic State Committee.

Early life
Vahey was born on June 29, 1900 in Watertown, Massachusetts. His father, James H. Vahey Sr., was a prominent attorney and two time Democratic nominee for Governor of Massachusetts. During World War I, Vahey served in the United States Navy as a quartermaster. He graduated from Princeton University in 1922 and Boston University Law School in 1925.

Legal career
After law school, Vahey worked in his father's law office. Following his death in 1929, the younger Vahey took over the firm and also succeed his father as counsel for the Boston Street Carmen's Union and general counsel for the Amalgamated Association of Street and Electric Railway Employees of America. He later succeeded Frederick Mansfield as counsel for the Massachusetts Federation of Labor. During his career, Vahey represented as many as forty labor unions. During World War II he served as chief counsel for the American Red Cross offices in the Secretary of War and Secretary of the Navy's office. He was tasked with reviewing the service records of discharged servicemen as part of the G.I. Bill. He was responsible for getting the military to revise the records of pilots who broke down after many missions over enemy territory. In 1946 he was appointed assistant corporation counsel for the city of Boston.

Party chairman
In 1948, Vahey was a leader of Paul A. Dever gubernatorial campaign and Harry S. Truman's presidential campaign in Massachusetts. Following Dever's election he and his chief secretary J. John Fox, both former law school  classmates of Vahey's, backed him for chairman of the Massachusetts Democratic State Committee. He was elected on February 19, 1949. His tenure as chairman was short however, as Vahey died suddenly on November 3, 1949 after a brief illness.

References

1900 births
1949 deaths
American labor lawyers
Boston University School of Law alumni
Massachusetts Democratic Party chairs
Massachusetts lawyers
People from Watertown, Massachusetts
Politicians from Boston
Princeton University alumni
Amalgamated Transit Union people
20th-century American lawyers